Charles Prather (born 1953) is an American former firefighter who was the second Fire Chief of the Orange County Fire Authority (OCFA) in California, United States.

Early life and career
Chip is the son of the late Charles W. Prather, longtime chief of the University of California, Davis Fire Department from the 1950s to the 80s.  Chip began his career in 1970 as a seasonal firefighter with the California Department of Forestry, now known as California Department of Forestry and Fire Protection (CAL Fire).

Fire chief
Prather was named the Fire Chief of the Orange County Fire Authority on October 1, 1997.

Prather's leadership can be characterized as unusually involved in the community in which he served. Prather would commonly address derision directly, often responding to blogging critics online and answering his own rookie firefighters' complaints in person (see Orange County Register article from March 31, 2006).
The level of investment shown by the Chief earned the respect of the firefighters which served under his leadership, resulting in numerous accolades from state and federal agencies as well as a resolution approved by the board of Orange County Board of Directors on June 25, 2009.

During his tenure as Fire Chief, Prather developed and/or expanded many instrumental safety programs including: the Paramedic Assessment Unit Program, the Urban Search and Rescue Team, Helicopter Program, Safety Officer Response Plan, the Automatic External Defibrillator Program, Swift Water Rescue Team, Technical Truck Program, WEFIT Program, and Occupant Liaison Program. These programs greatly increased the status and quality of Orange County's regional fire protection, and attracted fire departments from across the globe to emulate the OCFA's procedures (including fire departments in Japan).

Fire Chief Prather sought to create a new headquarters for the fire department which he had expanded and improved, and accomplished this goal in 2004. The new Regional Fire Operations and Training Center (RFOTC) completed construction in June 2004, and moved the OCFA from its former headquarters on Water St. in the city of Orange to the northeast border of Irvine, California. The training center is one of the most advanced in the world, with a six-story tower that can be remotely set ablaze and extinguished, swiftwater rescue canals, train track and airplane fuselage for Mass Casualty Incident training, and an underground dispatch center that can flex over 18 inches in the event of earthquakes. While its construction was a complex project involving the efforts of many stakeholders, the RFOTC became a visible symbol of the Chief's success in transforming the once fledgling fire department into a world class institution.

Chip Prather oversaw Orange County's Federal Emergency Management Agency Urban search and rescue Team, CA-TF5, one of only eight in the state of California and 28 in the entire United States. In November 2008, Prather expanded this program by adding the first nationally certified canine and handler team in Orange County.

Safety, prevention, and education
All of Chief Prather's achievements have helped Orange County's cities become some of the safest in America. The city of Irvine for example, is served by over eight OCFA fire stations, and has been ranked the number one safest city in America for four years in a row (for a population over 100,000).

Quotes
"Be tough, be tender, be safe."

References

American fire chiefs
Living people
1953 births